"Move Your Body" is a song by Australian singer and songwriter Sia. It was released in January 2017 as the fourth single from her seventh studio album This Is Acting (2016). The song was used in a commercial for the 500 Lexus LC.

Background
"Move Your Body" was originally intended for Shakira, but was rejected. Sia commented on her interview in 2015 with Rolling Stone, saying, "One of them is a Shakira reject, which there's no doubt when you hear it. You'll know that it was a Shakira reject because I sound like Shakira."

Critical reception
Overall response to the song was mixed. Bradley Stern of MuuMuse raved: "'Move Your Body', a pulsating Shakira offering, proves once again that the 'Titanium' singer is a more than welcome addition to the club scene, providing a sweaty, carnal call-to-arms filled with an instant catchy chant for the dance floor."
Alex McCown-Levy of The A.V. Club wrote: "Move Your Body, [Sia's] attempt at a straight-up Europop dance-floor jam, suffers from a lack of distinction. It's an obvious play for a club hit, but it feels a bit predictable and safe—enjoyable, yes, but so calculated as to be stripped of any sense of engagement, like Robyn on autopilot." Carl Wilson of Billboard called the song "overwhelming", while Lindsay Zolandz of Vulture.com deemed it "the most ridiculous song on This Is Acting", and "catchy dance track" is how The New Zealand Herald's Kim Gillespie described the number. Idolator's Kathy Iandoli argued that the song "makes a valiant attempt to lighten things up a bit." Writing for The Guardian, Kitty Empire said: "There is nothing wrong with [Move Your Body], if you like your pop as gusty as a typhoon."

The Independent's Hugh Montgomery called the song a "stuttering dancefloor magnet", while Sal Cinquemani of Slant Magazine offered that "[songs like] “Move Your Body,” whose unabashed 4/4 beat and clattering EDM percussion are straight out of Rihanna's Loud, seem more like dated outtakes than underappreciated gems." Sarah Rodman of The Boston Globe wrote "The thumping groove of “Move Your Body” — which in a just world would be a dancefloor smash — has Shakira written all over it, and inspires the titular command."

Lyric video
A lyric video of "Move Your Body" was uploaded on Sia's Vevo account on YouTube on 12 January 2017. The video is set in a photography studio in an American Mall in 1987, and features a girl (portrayed by Lilliana Ketchman) and her parents in a glamour photo shoot until she runs off set, where she finds Sia's signature black-and-blonde wig in a dressing room and tries it on. She then photobombs strangers' posed pictures until her parents drag her away, but the strangers invite her back for even more photos and dance along with her.

Versions
 Move Your Body (Album version) – 4:07
 Move Your Body (Single mix) – 4:12
 Move Your Body (Alan Walker Remix) – 3:41

Charts

Weekly charts

Year-end Charts

Certifications

Release history

See also
 List of number-one dance singles of 2017 (U.S.)

References

2016 songs
2017 singles
Sia (musician) songs
Song recordings produced by Greg Kurstin
Songs written by Greg Kurstin
Songs written by Sia (musician)